Tiantai County (Tai-chow dialect: T'in-t'e yön) is located in Taizhou, Zhejiang Province, People's Republic of China. Residents mainly speak the Tiantai dialect.

The county is noted for its scenic Mount Tiantai, which is also an important Tiantai Buddhism site. Tiantai County's history dates back to the Qin Dynasty (221–208 BCE) when it was called Dongyue, later changed to Huipu during the Han Dynasty (208 BCE–220 CE).

Tiantai has extensive natural resources including water power, wind power, mines and biological resources. It tops other cities within the province with a total 51,600 kW water power output and is listed in the first batch of model cities of electrification nationwide. A milestone project, Tongbai Pumped Storage Power Station was completed in 2008. The investment is estimated at up to 4.2 billion RMB. Tiantai's metal resources include silver, lead, zinc, tungsten and aluminum.

The private sector constitutes the largest part of the local economy. There are six mainstay industries including rubber & plastics, industrial fabrics, art works, pharmaceuticals, machinery and brewing. In 2003, Tiantai's GDP was 4.7 billion RMB with tax revenues of 560 million RMB.

Administrative divisions
Subdistricts:
Chicheng Subdistrict (赤城街道), Shifeng Subdistrict (始丰街道), Fuxi Subdistrict (福溪街道)

Towns:
Baihe (白鹤镇), Shiliang (石梁镇), Jietou (街头镇), Pingqiao (平桥镇), Tantou (坦头镇), Sanhe (三合镇), Hongchou (洪畴镇)

Townships:
Sanzhou Township (三州乡), Longxi Township (龙溪乡), Leifeng Township (雷峰乡), Nanping Township (南屏乡), Yongxi Township (泳溪乡)

Climate

References

 
County-level divisions of Zhejiang
Taizhou, Zhejiang